Wynne Arboleda (born November 26, 1976) is a Filipino former professional basketball player. He is known by his moniker "The Snatcher" in reference to his steals during games.

Career
Arboleda first played for the Laguna Lakers in the MBA and later entered the PBA in 2000. He had short stints with the Pop Cola Panthers and the Tanduay Rhum Masters before joining the FedEx Express.

Fan incident
On October 16, 2009, during his team's game against Smart Gilas at the Araneta Coliseum, specifically halfway in the second quarter, Arboleda was involved in an incident where he assaulted a paying spectator, Alain Katigbak, after the latter shouted profane words directed at him following his second flagrant foul against Gilas' Marnel "Mac" Baracael.  As a result of the second flagrant foul, he was ejected from the court soon after.

Three days later, PBA Commissioner Sonny Barrios suspended him for the rest of the 2009–2010 season plus one game without pay, effective immediately, on top of any possible court case Katigbak would file against him as a result of the assault.  The suspension is said to be the league's heaviest sanction to date.  In addition, he was fined PhP20,000 for the two flagrant 1 fouls he committed, and was blacklisted from attending PBA games during the period of his suspension.

See also
 List of violent spectator incidents in sports

References

1976 births
Living people
Air21 Express players
Barako Bull Energy players
Basketball players from Aklan
MLQU Stallions basketball players
Filipino men's basketball players
Hiligaynon people
NLEX Road Warriors players
Pop Cola Panthers players
Tanduay Rhum Masters players
Point guards